Muwanga Muhammad Kivumbi (born October 19, 1973) is a Ugandan economist, politician and member of parliament of Uganda from Butambala. He is the Chairperson of Buganda parliamentary caucus.

Early life and education 
Kivumbi was born in Butambala District, Central Uganda.  He earned his First School Leaving Certificate from Gombe Primary School in 1986 and obtained Uganda Certificate of Education (UCE) from Kibuli Secondary School in 1990. He studied for his Uganda Advanced Certificate of Education (UACE) from 1990 to 1993 before enrolling in Makerere University where graduated with bachelor degree in Economics in 1998. In 2003, he earned an Associate Degree in Democracy and Development from Uganda Martyrs University and a Master of Human Resource Management from Uganda Management Institute (UMI) in 2004.

Political career 
Kivumbi was a member of Democratic Party (DP) before defecting to National Unity Party (NUP). He was elected the Chairperson of Buganda parliamentary caucus in the 11th parliament.

References 

Living people
1973 births
Ugandan economists
Members of the Parliament of Uganda
Makerere University alumni